Pohled is a municipality and village in Havlíčkův Brod District in the Vysočina Region of the Czech Republic. It has about 700 inhabitants.

Administrative parts
The village of Simtany is an administrative part of Pohled.

Gallery

References

Villages in Havlíčkův Brod District